She'eh Ne'esar is a pizmon (responsory hymn) in the Seliḥot of the fast of the Seventeenth of Tammuz. It is signed with the acrostic Shelomoh, and deals with the four disasters of which the fast is traditionally the anniversary, namely:
 the breaking of the two tablets by Moses;
 the cessation of the Temple daily offering;
 the storming of the outer defenses of Jerusalem during the Roman siege; and 
 the burning of a Torah scroll by Apostomus.

See also
 Seventeenth of Tammuz
 Selichot

References
 

Jewish liturgical poems
Jewish prayer and ritual texts
Works of unknown authorship
Hebrew words and phrases in Jewish prayers and blessings